

Aref
Hassan Aref, Egyptian physicist
Mohammad Reza Aref, Iranian politician, former vice-president of Iran  
Yassin M. Aref, American terror suspect

Arif
Mahmud Arif, (1909 – 2001) Saudi Arabian poet
Abdul Salam Arif and Abdul Rahman Arif, brothers presidents of Iraq
Adil Arif (born 1994), Emirati cricketer
Ahmed Arif (1927–1991), Turkish poet
Celalettin Arif (1875–1928), Turkish politician
Kader Arif (born 1953), French politician of Algiers origin
Muhammad Arif (disambiguation), several people
Naved Arif, Professional cricketer
Tevfik Arif, real estate developer and financier for Donald Trump

See also
Arif (given name)